Eldey is a small island about  off the coast of the Reykjanes Peninsula in southwest Iceland. Its sheer cliffs are home to large numbers of birds, including one of the largest northern gannet colonies in the world, with around 16,000 pairs. This colony can now be watched live via two webcams that are located on top of the island.

Volcanic system
The Eldey and Geirfuglasker volcanic systems together form the 35-40 km (20 to 25 mile) long Eldey system on the mid-Atlantic ridge. There is not a  central volcano.

The last of the great auks 
The island formerly supported the last remnant population of the flightless great auks, after the birds moved there from Geirfuglasker following a volcanic eruption in 1830. When the colony was discovered in 1835, almost fifty birds were counted. Museums, desiring the skins of the auk for preservation and display, quickly began collecting birds from the colony. The last pair, found incubating an egg, were killed there in June 1844, when Icelandic sailors Jón Brandsson and Sigurður Ísleifsson strangled the adults and Ketill Ketilsson accidentally cracked the last egg of the species with his boot during the struggle.

In literature 
 Eldey, and the fate of the great auk, are mentioned in The Water-Babies, A Fairy Tale for a Land Baby by Charles Kingsley.
 Eldey is described in detail in The Sixth Extinction: An Unnatural History by Elizabeth Kolbert.
 The Great Auk, a novel by Allan W. Eckert, c. 1963, Library of Congress Cat.#63-18215

References

External links 
 
 Eldey in the Catalogue of Icelandic Volcanoes
 Live webcam

Uninhabited islands of Iceland
Stacks of Iceland
Islands of Iceland